The Pearl Initiative is a non-profit organization founded in 2010 that focuses on corporate governance, accountability and transparency in the Persian Gulf region.

History
The Pearl Initiative was founded in 2010 in cooperation with the United Nations Office for Partnerships to promote higher standards in corporate governance, accountability, and transparency in the Gulf region. The organization was granted Special Consultative Status with the United Nations Economic and Social Council in 2019. In 2020, the Pearl Initiative launched its updated strategy "PI Vision 2025".

Activities
The Pearl Initiative’s activities includes programs that cover governance-related topics for corporations, family firms, micro, small and medium-sized enterprises, and philanthropic organizations. The organization engages with academia and hosts forums, workshops, and round-tables.

Programs

Anti-Corruption Best Practices: Launched in partnership with the Siemens Integrity Initiative in October 2015, the program focuses on providing GCC businesses with tools to implement and evaluate their integrity practices.

Diversity in Business Leadership: The program was launched in 2014, and promotes diversity and inclusion in business operations as pillars of corporate governance.

Governance in MSMEs: Established in 2017, the ‘Corporate Governance Fundamentals’ digital platform was launched to help the Gulf Region’s micro, small and medium-sized enterprises build and customize corporate governance practices.

Governance in Philanthropy: Delivered with support from the Bill & Melinda Gates Foundation, the program was launched in 2017, and focuses on governance practices adopted by philanthropic organizations in the Gulf Region. In May 2020, the program launched the Gulf Business Philanthropy Circle, an online resource center for donors.

Governance in Family Firms: Launched in 2012, the program aims to address common governance issues within family businesses, and provide information on existing best practices adopted by prominent family firms across the Gulf Region.

Governance in Tech: Launched in 2021, the program emphasizes the corporate governance practices adopted by technology companies in the Persian Gulf region and aims to understand the corporate governance capabilities that can be adopted across each development stage of a tech firm’s lifecycle.

Events
In 2015, the Pearl Initiative hosted the inaugural Regional Forum in Dubai under the theme Corporate Accountability Matters. The forum was held in partnership with the United Nations Global Compact that co-hosted the second Regional Forum in 2016, titled Sustainability in Action: Business and the Sustainable Development Goals. The Governance in Focus forum was held in Riyadh in 2018, co-hosted by Saudi Aramco.

Structure and key people
The Pearl Initiative’s Board of Governors and CEO Council is made up of members representing Saudi Aramco, Tadawul, Shell, Ernst & Young, PwC, Aramex, Chalhoub Group, KPMG, Bank of Sharjah, Saudi Telecommunications Company, Freshfields Bruckhaus Deringer, Dana Gas, Crescent Petroleum, Gulftainer, Al Rajhi Partners, Crescent Enterprises, and ASDA'A.

In 2018, the Pearl Initiative’s Board of Governors established a Student Advisory Board made up of students from the American University of Sharjah, Effat University, Ahlia University, Abu Dhabi University and Prince Sultan University.

In 2021, the Pearl Initiative announced the appointment of Ranya Saadawi as its Executive Director.

Publications
Publications by the Pearl Initiative include:

 CEO Perspectives Report: Corporate Stewardship in Times of Crisis
 Women in the Economy: The UAE Outlook
 The State of Governance in Philanthropy – Gulf Region
 GCC Corporate Good Practices in Accountability and Transparency

References

External links
 
 Gulf Corporate Integrity Indicator

Charities based in the United Arab Emirates
Organizations established in 2010